The Sierraville School, at 305 S. Lincoln St. (California State Route 89) in Sierraville, California, was listed on the National Register of Historic Places] in 2017. The listing included two contributing buildings and two contributing objects.

The school is Art Deco in style and was built in 1931.

It has also been known as Sierraville-Randolph School and as Sierraville School Community Center

The other contributing resources are "a metal flagpole located in the front schoolyard, a four-way drinking fountain located on the rear, northwest side, and a multipurpose wood-framed garage".

References

External links

School buildings on the National Register of Historic Places in California
National Register of Historic Places in Sierra County, California
School buildings completed in 1931
Buildings and structures in Sierra County, California